What's a Man to Do is the solo debut studio album by Frankie J released on May 27, 2003. Although uncertified, What's a Man to Do spawned the radio hit "Don't Wanna Try".

Track listing

References

2003 debut albums
Frankie J albums
Albums produced by Happy Perez
Columbia Records albums